Mind-mindedness is a concept in developmental psychology. It refers to a caregiver's tendency to view their child as an individual with a mind, rather than merely an entity with needs that must be satisfied. Mind-mindedness involves adopting the intentional stance towards another person. Individual differences in mind-mindedness have been observed in the first year of life, and have been observed to have important developmental consequences.

History 
The termed was coined by the psychologists Elizabeth Meins and Charles Fernyhough as part of a rethinking of the concept of maternal sensitivity.

Research findings on mind-mindedness have been proposed to have implications for parenting practices.

References

External links 
Mind-mindedness coding manual

Developmental psychology